The anterior divisions of the lumbar nerves, sacral nerves, and coccygeal nerve form the lumbosacral plexus, the first lumbar nerve being frequently joined by a branch from the twelfth thoracic. For descriptive purposes this plexus is usually divided into three parts:
 lumbar plexus 
 sacral plexus
 pudendal plexus

Injuries to the lumbosacral plexus are predominantly witnessed as bone injuries. Lumbosacral trunk and sacral plexus palsies are common injury patterns.

References

External links
  - "Lumbosacral Plexus"

Additional Images

Nerve plexus
Nerves of the lower limb and lower torso